Creola is a city in Mobile County, Alabama, United States. Incorporated in 1978, the city had a population of 1,936 at the 2020 census. It is part of the Mobile metropolitan area.

History

In 2013 the governments of Creola and Saraland were taking steps in a possible merger.

Geography
Creola is located in northeastern Mobile County at  (30.895465, -88.014760). It is bordered to the west by the city of Saraland and to the southwest by the city of Satsuma. The eastern border of the city is the Mobile River, which forms the Baldwin County line. U.S. Route 43 passes through the community, leading south  to Mobile and north the same distance to Mount Vernon. Interstate 65 crosses Creola as well, with access from Exit 19 (U.S. 43) and Exit 22 (Sailor Road). I-65 leads south to Mobile and northeast  to Montgomery.

Demographics

2000 census
As of the census of 2000, there were 2,002 people, 718 households, and 567 families residing in the town. The racial makeup of the town was 86.36% White, 9.89% Black or African American, 1.45% Native American, 0.10% Asian, 0.35% from other races, and 1.85% from two or more races. 0.65% of the population were Hispanic or Latino of any race.

There were 718 households, out of which 40.7% had children under the age of 18 living with them, 59.9% were married couples living together, 14.8% had a female householder with no husband present, and 20.9% were non-families. 17.1% of all households were made up of individuals, and 5.8% had someone living alone who was 65 years of age or older. The average household size was 2.79 and the average family size was 3.15.

In the town the population was spread out, with 29.2% under the age of 18, 9.6% from 18 to 24, 29.7% from 25 to 44, 22.3% from 45 to 64, and 9.2% who were 65 years of age or older. The median age was 34 years. For every 100 females, there were 93.8 males. For every 100 females age 18 and over, there were 95.9 males.

The median income for a household in the town was $35,517, and the median income for a family was $38,942. Males had a median income of $35,658 versus $19,911 for females. The per capita income for the town was $14,956. About 14.3% of families and 16.0% of the population were below the poverty line, including 18.5% of those under age 18 and 19.9% of those age 65 or over.

2010 census
As of the census of 2010, there were 1,926 people, 692 households, and 519 families residing in the town. The racial makeup of the town was 84.7% White, 9.8% Black or African American, 1.8% Native American, 0.1% Asian, 1.9% from other races, and 1.7% from two or more races. 3.1% of the population were Hispanic or Latino of any race.

There were 692 households, out of which 34.0% had children under the age of 18 living with them, 55.3% were married couples living together, 12.9% had a female householder with no husband present, and 25.0% were non-families. 18.4% of all households were made up of individuals, and 6.6% had someone living alone who was 65 years of age or older. The average household size was 2.78 and the average family size was 3.13.

In the town the population was spread out, with 25.2% under the age of 18, 11.3% from 18 to 24, 26.1% from 25 to 44, 26.2% from 45 to 64, and 11.2% who were 65 years of age or older. The median age was 35.6 years. For every 100 females, there were 108.2 males. For every 100 females age 18 and over, there were 110.7 males.

The median income for a household in the town was $41,786, and the median income for a family was $48,009. Males had a median income of $45,729 versus $36,902 for females. The per capita income for the town was $19,202. About 14.7% of families and 18.3% of the population were below the poverty line, including 29.1% of those under age 18 and 14.4% of those age 65 or over.

2020 census

As of the 2020 United States census, there were 1,936 people, 585 households, and 447 families residing in the city.

Education
Mobile County Public School System operates public schools. Students are zoned to North Mobile County K-8 School, previously North Mobile County Middle School, near Axis CDP. Creola students go to Citronelle High School in Citronelle.

History of schools
On September 7, 2010, North Mobile County Middle School opened, replacing the role of Adams Middle School in Saraland, because residents outside of Saraland are no longer zoned to Adams Middle. This rezoning affected residents in Creola, who were newly assigned to North Mobile County.

Prior to the 2012 split of the City of Satsuma from the Mobile County system, Creola was zoned to Satsuma schools, including Satsuma High School. In 2011 Renee Busbee of the Mobile Press-Register said that residents of Creola may be rezoned to Blount, Citronelle, and/or Vigor high schools.

Ultimately Creola, without an elementary school after the departure of Satsuma schools, was rezoned to North Mobile County, converted into a K-8, and Citronelle High. Any Creola residents wishing to send their children to Satsuma schools would be required to pay tuition.  about 100 students residing in Creola attended Satsuma schools.

Due to the distance to Citronelle High (the distance by bus is about 30 minutes), several area parents wanted an annexation to the City of Satsuma and/or a partnership with the Satsuma school system. In 2013 a member of the Creola city council, Tonya Moss, stated that the city has "a bond with Satsuma" and that most of the council's members had graduated from Satsuma High. By 2013 there were discussions regarding a possible educational partnership between representatives of the two cities, in which the Creola city government would pay the City of Satsuma instead of Mobile County to educate its children.

Transportation
Intercity bus service is provided by Greyhound Lines.

References

External links

Cities in Mobile County, Alabama
Cities in Alabama